The 2006 Indo-Pak series (known as the Airtel Trophy for sponsorship reasons) was the 8th series of bilateral field hockey matches between Pakistan and India.

The six match series was played over two legs on home and away basis with three matches hosted in each country from 17 February to 2006 to 26 February 2006. Pakistan won the series 3–1. Pakistan won their fourth consecutive and overall sixth series against India. This was the first time India did not lose the away leg of the series and remained unbeaten in Pakistan.

Background 
Prior to the start of the series Pakistan had won five out of seven bilateral series where as India won one and one was drawn. The two teams had met in December last year earlier in Chennai at the 2005 Champions Trophy with India winning 2–3. Both teams participated in a 4-Nations tournament in Netherlands month before that but did not face each other Pakistan won the tournament defeating Australia 4–3 in the final.

Venues

Squads 
India announced its squad on 2 February 2006. India named a rather young squad leaving out many veteran players like Gagan Ajit Singh, Deepak Thakur, captain Dileep Tirkey, Viren Rasquinha and Prabhjot Singh. The Pakistan squad was announced on 8 February 2006. The team was announced by Chief Selector Akhtar Rasool after the two days trials in Islamabad. Muhmmad Saqlain was named as captain despite his ill disciplinary record recently.

Results 

 Pakistan won the series 3–1.

Matches

First leg 
Match 1
Match 2
Match 3

Second leg 
Match 1
Match 2
Match 3

Statistics

Goalscorers 
There were 21 goals scored in 6 matches for an average of 3.5 goals per match.

References 

2006 in field hockey